Livingston L. Holder Jr. (born 29 September 1956) is a former USAF astronaut in the Manned Spaceflight Engineer Program during the mid-1980s. He was assigned to fly as a military payload specialist on the Space Shuttle, but could not fly in space due to the Challenger accident in 1986.

Biography
Holder was born in Detroit, Michigan, United States and now resides in Seattle, Washington. He has three sons (Jonathan, Nathan, and Christopher). He holds a B.S. in Astronautical Engineering from the United States Air Force Academy, and an M.S. in Systems Management from University of Southern California. While serving in the Air Force, Holder was a Titan III launch crew member at Vandenberg AFB, California. He also served in the Office of the Secretary of the Air Force, Special Projects organization, Los Angeles AFS, California, on a classified satellite program.

Holder trained and qualified as a Manned Spaceflight Engineer and Space Shuttle payload specialist from 1982 to 1988. He remains active in supporting youth education through the Space Foundation, most recently visiting Alaska schools to share his experiences.

Holder joined Boeing in 1988, where he was the manager of the aircraft and spacecraft segments of the RESOURCE21 Program. Later he managed the International Space Station (ISS) international integration activities with responsibility for the ISS Habitation Module. In 1994 he became the program manager for the Sea Launch program during initial development. He was Chief Engineer and Program Manager of Aviation Information Services (the precursor to Connexion by Boeing). From 1995 to 1996, Holder led Boeing's Future Space Transportation organizations, which included Boeing's participation in the X-33/Reusable Launch Vehicle Program.

Holder served as the Chairperson for COMSTAC at the US Department of Transportation from May 2000 until October 2003. In 2002, he joined Andrews Space as Vice President Space Systems, where he was responsible for the company's space system design, development, and new business activities. He led the company to its first DoD contracts on the Falcon program, a joint DARPA/USAF effort. He was also the manager for a joint effort between Northrop Grumman Corporation (NGC) and Andrews Space in the NASA funded 2nd Generation Reusable Launch Vehicle (RLV) program.

In 2006, Holder joined AirLaunch LLC (founded by space entrepreneur Gary Hudson) as Chief Program Executive. Under his leadership, AirLaunch achieved several technical milestones including the largest and heaviest object ever dropped from a C-17 and the largest and longest Vapor Pressurized rocket engine firings in history.

He currently heads Holder Aerospace, an engineering consulting company in partnership with Curtis Gifford, located in Renton, Washington. He also serves on the board of advisors for Space for Humanity.

See also
List of African-American astronauts

References

External links 
The Boeing Company
Andrews Space
Holder Aerospace
Space Foundation

United States Air Force Academy alumni
1956 births
Living people
American astronauts